Reha Erdem (born 1960 in Istanbul) is a Turkish film director and screenwriter.

Biography

He attended Galatasaray High School and studied history at Boğaziçi University before leaving to study film in 1983. He obtained a B.A. in Cinema Studies and an M.A. in Plastic Arts from the University of Paris VIII.

Erdem's critical approach to masculinity gives him a unique place among the directors of new Turkish cinema.

Filmography

Awards
 3rd Yeşilçam Awards (March 23, 2010) - Best Director Award for Hayat Var (Won)

References

External links

1960 births
Film people from Istanbul
Living people
Turkish film directors
Best Screenplay Golden Orange Award winners
Best Director Golden Orange Award winners
Best Screenplay Golden Boll Award winners
Galatasaray High School alumni
Boğaziçi University alumni
Best Director Golden Boll Award winners